Geli Castle is a historical castle located in Qom County in Qom Province, The longevity of this fortress dates back to the Parthian Empire.

References 

Castles in Iran
Parthian castles